The 1991 Los Angeles Raiders season was their 32nd in the National Football League (NFL). They were unable to improve upon their previous season's output of 12–4, winning only nine games. After a 9–4 start, the team lost its last three games, but did qualify for the playoffs for the second straight season. The Raiders were inconsistent offensively, with struggling quarterback Jay Schroeder eventually benched in favor of rookie Todd Marinovich. It was notable that future Hall of Famer Marcus Allen's role was restricted mainly to backing up newly acquired Roger Craig, and future All-Pro Tim Brown also played mostly as a reserve, starting only one game. The loss of Bo Jackson to a career-ending injury also clearly had an impact. A solid defense was led by Howie Long, Greg Townsend (13 sacks) and Ronnie Lott (8 interceptions).

Staff

Roster

Regular season

Schedule

Season summary

Week 1 at Oilers

Week 2 vs Broncos

Standings

Playoffs

References

External links
 1991 Los Angeles Raiders at Pro-Football-Reference.com

Los Angeles Raiders seasons
Los Angeles Raiders
Los